Anna Zhvania (born July 24, 1970) is a Georgian sociologist and politician who served as head of the foreign intelligence branch of Georgia from 2006 until 2008, being the first female to have been appointed to this post in Georgia.

Education
Born in St. Petersburg, Zhvania graduated from Saint-Petersburg State University of Culture and Arts in 1994. She holds an MA in Modern History of the Central European University in Budapest and gained her Ph.D. in Social science from Ilia State University in Tbilisi.

Career
Zhvania worked as programme coordinator of the Liberty Institute from 1998 until 1999. 

In 2006, Zhvania served as an advisor to President of Georgia Mikheil Saakashvili on civic integration. She later headed the Georgian Intelligence Service, the foreign intelligence branch of Georgia, from 2006 until 2008. She was replaced by Gela Bezhuashvili.

In the government of President Saakashvili, Zhvania served as First Deputy Minister for Education and Science from 2008 until 2009, under the leadership of minister Nika Gvaramia. She went on to work as an adviser to the Minister of Defence in the field of policy advising and communication with partners from 2009 until 2013, serving under successive ministers Bacho Akhalaia (2009–2012), Dimitri Shashkini (2012) and Irakli Alasania (2012–2013).  

After leaving government office, Zhvania briefly served as director at the Richard G. Lugar Center for Public Health Research (CPHR) in Tbilisi. Since 2013, she has been a senior research fellow at the Georgian Institute for Strategic Studies (GISS). She is also a lecturer at Illia State University. Her area of teaching is sociology.

References

Living people
21st-century women politicians from Georgia (country)
21st-century politicians from Georgia (country)
1970 births